Solo for Canary is a British thriller television series which originally aired on the BBC in 1958.

Selected cast
 Andrew Osborn as Supt. Maddern
 Lana Morris as Ruth Maddern
 David Davies as Chief Supt. Drew 
 John Stone as Det. Supt. Wilson 
 Ilona Ference as Rose
 Edward Kelsey as Flower 
 William Lucas as Durea
 William Dexter as Detective Knowles
 Peter M. Elrington as Detective Brown
 Keith Anderson as  Police Constable
 William Fox as Conner
 Bryan Kendrick as  Ryan
 Clive Marshall as Charlie
 Jimmy Ray as  Johnny
 Anne Rogers as Jill
 Barbara Shelley as Marie Vazzani
 Terence Alexander as Flash
 George Pravda as Joseph Viga
 Allan Jeayes as  Judge
 Marne Maitland as Fink
 Lockwood West as  Dr. Lessinger

References

Bibliography
Baskin, Ellen . Serials on British Television, 1950-1994. Scolar Press, 1996.

External links
 

BBC television dramas
1958 British television series debuts
1958 British television series endings
English-language television shows